Xerri is a surname. Notable people with the surname include:

 Bronson Xerri (born 2000), Australian rugby league footballer
 Dun Mikiel Xerri (1737–1799), Maltese patriot
 Joseph Xerri (18th century), Maltese theologian
 Tristan Xerri (born 1999), Australian rules footballer

See also
 Xerri's Grotto, cave in Malta

Maltese-language surnames